Aberdeen South may refer to:
 Aberdeen South (UK Parliament constituency)
 Aberdeen South (Scottish Parliament constituency)